The Halleck Range is a small mountain range in southeastern Alaska, United States, located on the Alaskan side of the Portland Canal. It has an area of 127 km2 and is a subrange of the Boundary Ranges which in turn form part of the Coast Mountains. The range is located within the Misty Fjords National Monument.

See also
List of mountain ranges

References

Boundary Ranges
Mountains of Ketchikan Gateway Borough, Alaska